Events in the year 1992 in Romania.

Incumbents
 President: Ion Iliescu
 Prime Minister: Theodor Stolojan (until November 18), Nicolae Văcăroiu (starting November 18)

Events

Full date unknown
The Romanian Cultural Institute (ICR) organizes summer courses in Romanian for language teachers.

Politics

1992 Romanian local elections.

1992 Romanian general election.

Births

March 6 – Marian Fuchs.
 March 28 – Elena Bogdan, tennis player
June 21 – Mădălin Martin, professional footballer
August 20 – Andrei Peteleu, professional footballer
November 25 – Ana Bogdan, tennis player

Deaths

February 24 – Ion Lăpușneanu.
April 21 – Ioan Totu.
July 10 – Ion Bogdan.
Full date unknown:
 Alexandru Nicolschi, Lieutenant General (b. 1915)

References

Years of the 20th century in Romania
 
1990s in Romania
Romania
Romania